Zuster Bertken ('Sister Bertken') (1426 - 25 June 1514) was a Dutch anchorite.

She was born the illegitimate daughter of the canon priest Jacob van Lichtenberg. Her life before her enclosure is unknown, but she was evidently given a good education. In 1456 or 1457, with permission bishop David of Burgundy she let herself be enclosed in a cell as an anchorite at the Buurkerk in Utrecht. According to the description of her life, she lived an extremely ascetic life even for an anchorite. After her death, several songs and hymns were found among her belongings and published. Her songs described foremost her passion in her union with God and became popular. She was one of few Medieval Dutch women to become a part of the traditional Dutch literary canon. She is subject of the opera Suster Bertken (2010) by Rob Zuidam.

Bertken lived in a small cell adjacent to the Church of Utrecht for fifty-seven years until her death in 1514. Her daily activities were attending church from a window in her cell, meditation, prayer and writing. The only furniture in cell was a chair, desk and mattress. Berken never wore shoes and her diet excluded all dairy and meat products. 

Bertken died on 25 June 1514.

References 

1426 births
1514 deaths
15th-century women writers
15th-century writers
16th-century Dutch people
16th-century Dutch writers
Dutch hermits